Salem Radio Network is a United States-based radio network that specializes in syndicated Christian political talk, music, and conservative secular news/talk programming. It is a division of the Salem Media Group.

Network information 
Salem Radio Network was launched in 2009, and operates on mostly four radio formats: Christian talk and teaching (transmitted on AM in some areas and on FM in others), Contemporary Christian music (transmitted mostly on FM stations), conservative News/Talk format (transmitted on AM stations), and Christian Teaching (transmitted on AM stations).

Contemporary Christian Music is transmitted full-time on most stations, but in areas where Salem has a limited number of stations it is transmitted only part-time in morning and afternoon drive times on weekdays and weekend afternoons. Where Salem only has one FM station (WAVA-FM in Washington, D.C. and WORD-FM in Pittsburgh), CCM is transmitted  on weekends, with talk and teaching on weekdays. Most CCM stations play music full-time and do not sell blocks of time to religious organizations except sometimes on Sunday mornings.

Christian Talk, comprising talk shows where listeners call in and participate in the show, is transmitted during weekdays in some areas, and only in drive times in others. The rest of the day is filled with blocks of time ranging from a few minutes to an hour sold to churches and Christian organizations.

Conservative Talk (branded in most markets as “The Answer” since 2014) transmits full-time on a commercial basis. These stations only sell advertisement time, not blocks of time like Christian Talk counterparts (though brokered programming may be offered on weekends as secular stations often do). Some of these stations have religious programs on Sunday mornings.

The teaching format relies on selling blocks of time to organizations full-time. These stations offer diverse religious features such as church services, political and religious interview features, Christian family life programs, and children's shows. Music (exclusively Christian) is only transmitted by a few of these stations at times during the weekend.

Programming 
The company's Salem Radio Network subsidiary produces several talk radio shows and a 24-hour news service that are distributed to more than 2,000 radio affiliates around the country.

Daily

 Hugh Hewitt
 Mike Gallagher
 Dennis Prager
 Sebastian Gorka
 Brandon Tatum
 Charlie Kirk
 Eric Metaxas
 Cal Thomas (short-form commentary)
 Lou Dobbs (short-form commentary)
 Jerry Stewart's One Moment in America (short-form commentary)

Weekends
 Mark Davis
 Townhall.com Weekend Journal and Townhall.com Week in Review
 Bill Gaither's Homecoming
 The Dirt Doctor with Howard Garrett
 Big Billy Kinder Outdoors
 Armed American Radio
 The Forever Young Radio Show
 The World and Everything in It
 Steve Brown Etc.
 The Christian Outlook
 ''EggMan Ronnie James (multiple shows) (limited syndication)

William Bennett is a designated fill-in host. Bennett previously hosted Salem's morning drive-time show for a decade before retiring in March 2016.

The satellite feed for Salem's general market programming can be heard on the CRN Digital Talk Radio Networks, on CRN3.

Network properties

Satellite formats 
SRN also operates a satellite format program. The division known as "Salem Music Network" operates three satellite-driven networks. These feeds are mostly for stations in small and mid-size markets or HD Radio sub-channel use. Affiliates can operate these stations with a computer and satellite hookup.

Unlike other major radio networks, SRN's "affiliate hour clock" does not include a newscasting option. However, holes for local spots are provided. SRN's 24-hour-music formats include:

Other network holdings 

 = Available through terrestrial radio affiliates. 
 = Available only on satellite radio.

See also
 Lee Habeeb
 Phil Boyce

References

External links 
 

American radio networks
Christian mass media companies
Political mass media in the United States
Conservative media in the United States
2009 in radio
Internet properties established in 2009